Garner L. Holt is the founder and president of Garner Holt Productions, Inc., the world’s largest animatronics company. Garner Holt Productions was founded in 1977 and designs and manufactures animatronic figures for entertainment locations, including Disneyland, Knott’s Berry Farm, and the MGM Grand Las Vegas. Their best known figures include the 45-foot dragon at Disneyland’s Fantasmic! show, and the singing characters at Chuck E. Cheese.

Holt’s first experiments in crafting moving figures were showcased in a haunted house built in his parents' backyard in 1974. The following year he built another Halloween exhibit at the Central City Mall in San Bernardino, California. 

Holt's figures are also utilized by museums, visitor centers, and in education. Holt also designs parade floats, scenery, and theming elements and his figures are used for military training. He has also created prosthetic limbs prosthetics.

Garner is a native of San Bernardino, CA. After decades in San Bernardino, the business relocated to a 100,000 square foot building in nearby Redlands, CA in 2018.

Holt has received numerous awards for his entrepreneurial efforts as well as his company's creative achievements.  His company has been honored with nearly two dozen of the Themed Entertainment Association's Thea Awards (including Holt's 2014 Harrison "Buzz" Price Award Recognizing a Lifetime of Achievements). In 2016 Holt received the Disneyana Fan Club's (DFC) Disney Legend Award.

References

Living people
Animatronic engineers
Year of birth missing (living people)